Mary Elizabeth Twist (born 10 July 1956) is a British Labour Party politician. She has served as the Member of Parliament (MP) for Blaydon since the 2017 general election. Before her parliamentary career, she was the head of health in the North-East for the trade union, UNISON, and a local councillor.

Early life and career
Twist was born in July 1956 in St Helens, Lancashire.  She attended the Notre Dame High School (now De La Salle School, St Helens) and studied at Aberystwyth University. Twist worked as a local government archivist. She worked as a trade union official for UNISON and became their head of health in the North-East.

She credits her grandfather's activism in the National Union of Mineworkers as her inspiration to enter politics.

Political career
Twist was elected as a Labour Party councillor for Ryton, Crookhill & Stella ward in the Gateshead Council in 2012. She was the cabinet member for housing on the council. Twist was re-elected in 2016.

She was elected as MP for Blaydon in the 2017 general election with a majority of 13,477 (28.0%) votes. The seat has been represented by a Labour MP since 1935. Twist had worked in the constituency office of the previous MP David Anderson who chose to stand down for personal and health reasons. In parliament, she sits on the Commons Select Committee on Standards, and the Commons Select Committee of Privileges since February 2019. Twist was a member of the Housing, Communities and Local Government Committee between September 2017 and May 2019.

Twist supported the United Kingdom (UK) remaining within the European Union (EU) in the 2016 UK EU membership referendum. In the indicative votes on 27 March 2019, she voted for a referendum on a Brexit withdrawal agreement, for the Norway-plus model, and for a customs union with the EU.

She supported Emily Thornberry in the 2020 Labour Party leadership election.

She was appointed Shadow Scotland Minister in the November 2021 British shadow cabinet reshuffle.

Personal life
She is a widow. Twist disclosed in her maiden parliamentary speech in 2017 that her husband had died of suicide, and called for action on suicide prevention. She volunteers for the charity Samaritans. She lives in Ryton in her constituency.

References

External links

1956 births
Living people
Labour Party (UK) MPs for English constituencies
Female members of the Parliament of the United Kingdom for English constituencies
People from St Helens, Merseyside
UK MPs 2017–2019
UK MPs 2019–present
21st-century British women politicians
21st-century English women
21st-century English people
Alumni of Aberystwyth University